Lane Janger (born Lane Anthony Janger on November 27, 1966)  is an American independent film producer, director, writer and actor. He was born in Los Angeles, California and obtained a Master of Fine Arts in filmmaking at the New York University.

In 1999, he was the star, co-writer, director and producer of Just One Time, which became part of Boys Life 3 in 2000.

Personal life
Janger was previously in a relationship with David Burtka, until they split in 2003. Janger has two children, Javin and Flynn, born in 2000 via surrogate.

Filmography 

1994: I Like It Like That ... producer
1997: I Think I Do ... producer
1999: Just One Time ... actor, writer, director and producer

Shorts
1998: Just One Time ... actor, writer, director and producer, an 8-minute short on which the later full feature film was based.

References

External links 
 

Living people
Tisch School of the Arts alumni
1966 births
American male film actors
American film producers
American gay actors
Film directors from Los Angeles